Manfred Trojahn (born 22 October 1949) is a German composer, flautist, conductor and writer.

Career
Trojahn was born Cremlingen in Lower Saxony and began his musical studies in 1966 in orchestra music at the music school of Braunschweig. After graduating in 1970 he concluded his studies as a flutist at the Hochschule für Musik und Theater Hamburg with Karlheinz Zöller. From 1971 he studied composition with Diether de la Motte. He also studied with György Ligeti, conducting with Albert Bittner. Since 1991 he is professor for musical composition at the Robert Schumann Hochschule in Düsseldorf.

Works 
His works have been published by Bärenreiter and Sikorski.

Publications

Students 
Among Trojahn's students in composition are Oscar van Dillen, Matthias Pintscher and Daniel Hensel.

References

External links
 
 
 

Living people
German classical composers
1949 births
German classical flautists
German male conductors (music)
German writers about music
People from Wolfenbüttel (district)
Hochschule für Musik und Theater Hamburg alumni
Members of the Academy of Arts, Berlin
21st-century classical composers
German male non-fiction writers
German male classical composers
21st-century German composers
21st-century German conductors (music)
21st-century German male musicians
21st-century flautists